All-Ireland Junior Football Championship may refer to:
All-Ireland Junior Football Championship, a competition between Junior Gaelic Football teams representing Gaelic Athletic Association counties
All-Ireland Junior Club Football Championship, a competition between Men's Junior Gaelic Football clubs